Alberta Bigagli was an Italian psychologist and poet, born in Sesto Fiorentino in 1928. She died in August 2017. Her published works include the poetry collections L'arca di Noè (1986), In mezzo al cerchio (1989), Diamanti (1994), Olindo del fuoco (2001), and the prose collection L’amore è altro (1975).

External links
 Biography 
Another short biography and a sample of Bigagli's work 
Olindo del fuoco at the publisher's website 

1928 births
2017 deaths
Italian women poets
20th-century Italian poets
Italian women psychologists
Writers from Florence